The Virginia Heights Historic District is a national historic district located at Arlington County, Virginia.  It is directly west of the Columbia Forest Historic District. It contains 117 contributing buildings in a residential neighborhood in southwestern Arlington. The area was developed between 1946 and 1952, and consists of four small subdivisions of Section Four of Columbia Forest, High Point, Virginia Heights, and Frederick Hill.  The dwelling styles include Colonial Revival style houses and Modernist twin dwellings designed by noted local architect Charles M. Goodman. In addition, five single dwellings in Virginia Heights are known to be prefabricated houses, three of which are Lustron houses.

It was listed on the National Register of Historic Places in 2008.

References

Houses on the National Register of Historic Places in Virginia
Colonial Revival architecture in Virginia
Historic districts in Arlington County, Virginia
National Register of Historic Places in Arlington County, Virginia
Residential buildings completed in 1952
Modernist architecture in Virginia
Houses in Arlington County, Virginia
Historic districts on the National Register of Historic Places in Virginia